The Apollo-class sailing frigates were a series of twenty-seven ships that the British Admiralty commissioned be built to a 1798 design by Sir William Rule. Twenty-five served in the Royal Navy during the Napoleonic Wars, two being launched too late.

Of the 25 ships that served during the Napoleonic Wars, only one was lost to enemy action. Of the entire class of 27 ships, only two were lost to wrecking, and none to foundering.

The Admiralty ordered three frigates in 1798–1800. Following the Peace of Amiens, it ordered a further twenty-four sister-ships to the same design between 1803 and 1812. The last was ordered to a fresh 38-gun design. Initially, the Admiralty split the order for the 24 vessels equally between its yards and commercial yards, but two commercial yards failed to perform and the Admiralty transferred these orders to its own dockyards, making the split 14–10 as between the Admiralty and commercial yards.

Ships in class 
 
 Builder: John Dudman, Deptford Wharf
 Ordered: 15 September 1798
 Laid down: November 1798
 Launched: 16 August 1799
 Completed: 5 October 1799 at Deptford Dockyard
 Fate: Wrecked off Portugal on 2 April 1804.
 
 Builder: John Dudman, Deptford Wharf
 Ordered: 18 January 1799
 Laid down: February 1800
 Launched: 2 October 1800
 Completed: 17 January 1801 at Deptford Dockyard.
 Fate: Captured and burnt by the French 19 July 1805.
 
 Builder: Balthazar and Edward Adams, Bucklers Hard.
 Ordered: 16 August 1800
 Laid down: October 1801
 Launched: 6 June 1803
 Completed: 9 August 1803 at Portsmouth Dockyard.
 Fate: Sold to be broken up 16 August 1860 at Gibraltar.
 
 Builder: Mr Cook, Dartmouth (originally Benjamin Tanner, at same yard, but he became bankrupt in February 1807)
 Ordered: 17 March 1803 originally; re-ordered 2 June 1809
 Laid down: July 1804
 Launched: 28 August 1813
 Completed: 20 September 1813 at Plymouth Dockyard
 Fate: Hulked 1830 for quarantine service. Broken up November 1854.
 
 Builder: Plymouth Dockyard (originally Benjamin Tanner, but he became bankrupt in February 1807)
 Ordered: 17 March 1803 originally; re-ordered 23 December 1810
 Laid down: September 1811
 Launched: 1 May 1813
 Completed: 20 August 1813 at Plymouth Dockyard
 Fate: Broken up August 1833.
 
 Builder: Deptford Dockyard
 Ordered: 25 March 1806
 Laid down: April 1807
 Launched: 25 July 1808
 Completed: 6 September 1808
 Fate: Broken up November 1844.
 
 Builder: Thomas Steemson, Paull (near Hull)
 Ordered: 1 October 1806
 Laid down: January 1807
 Launched: 19 November 1808
 Completed: 22 March 1809 at Chatham Dockyard
 Fate: Prison ship 1842; sold for break-up 1884.
 
 Builder: Robert Guillaume, Northam (Southampton)
 Ordered: 1 October 1806
 Laid down: January 1808
 Launched: 23 September 1809
 Completed: 23 January 1810 at Portsmouth Dockyard
 Fate: Cut down into 24-gun sixth rate 1831. Broken up March 1849.
 
 Builder: Simon Temple, South Shields
 Ordered: 1 October 1806
 Laid down: March 1807
 Launched: 8 December 1809
 Completed: 1810
 Fate: Lost at sea with her entire crew 4 December 1811.
 
 Builder: George Parsons, Warsash
 Ordered: 1 October 1806
 Laid down: August 1807
 Launched: 13 October 1810
 Completed: 9 February 1811 at Portsmouth Dockyard
 Fate: Broken up January 1821.
 
 Builder: Wilson and Company, Liverpool
 Ordered: 1 October 1806
 Laid down: March 1808
 Launched: 26 March 1811
 Completed: 29 July 1811 at Plymouth Dockyard
 Fate: 1860 "Ragged School Ship", Cardiff; sold for breaking up in 1905.
 
 Builder: "Prince of Wales Island" (Penang), Malaya
 Ordered: 19 February 1807
 Laid down: February 1808
 Launched: 6 March 1809
 Completed: 28 October 1810 at Woolwich Dockyard
 Fate: Broken up in March 1816.
 
 Builder: Deptford Dockyard
 Ordered: 27 February 1808
 Laid down: August 1808
 Launched: 12 August 1809
 Completed: 21 September 1809.
 Fate: Broken up at Chatham Dockyard in August 1819.
 
 Builder: Woolwich Dockyard
 Ordered: 23 March 1808
 Laid down: October 1808
 Launched: 9 November 1809
 Completed: 8 December 1809.
 Fate: Sold to be broken up on 30 April 1817.
 
 Builder: George Parsons, Warsash
 Ordered: May 1808
 Laid down: June 1808
 Launched: 22 December 1809
 Completed: 25 April 1810 at Portsmouth Dockyard.
 Fate: Broken up at Plymouth Dockyard in May 1817.
 
 Builder: Woolwich Dockyard
 Ordered: 29 December 1806
 Laid down: October 1807
 Launched: 11 September 1809
 Completed: 18 October 1809.
 Fate: Wrecked 28 January 1812
 
 Builder: Robert Guillaume, Northam (Southampton)
 Ordered: 26 September 1808
 Laid down: December 1808
 Launched: May 1810
 Completed: 24 September 1810 at Portsmouth Dockyard.
 Fate: Broken up at Plymouth Dockyard in April 1851.
 
 Builder: Deptford Dockyard
 Ordered: 28 September 1808
 Laid down: December 1808
 Launched: 23 December 1809
 Completed: 16 February 1810.
 Fate: Sold to be broken up in July 1906.
 
 Builder: Deptford Dockyard
 Ordered: 12 May 1809
 Laid down: August 1809
 Launched: 31 August 1810
 Completed: 18 October 1810.
 Fate: Hulked in 1836; coal hulk (Jamaica) in 1840; broken up in 1849.
 
 Builder: Deptford Dockyard
 Ordered: 8 January 1810
 Laid down: September 1810
 Launched: 18 October 1811
 Completed: 13 December 1811.
 Fate: Coal hulk 1838. Broken up in January 1867.
 
 Builder: Deptford Dockyard
 Ordered: 17 October 1810
 Laid down: January 1811
 Launched: 26 September 1812
 Completed: November 1812.
 Fate: Broken up in September 1821.
 
 Builder: Daniel List, Binstead, Isle of Wight
 Ordered: 14 December 1810
 Laid down: April 1811
 Launched: 8 August 1812
 Completed: 24 October 1812 at Portsmouth Dockyard.
 Fate: Broken up in March 1845.
 
 Builder: Portsmouth Dockyard (originally Robert Guillaume, Northam, Southampton, but he became bankrupt in 1813)
 Ordered: 19 March 1811 originally; re-ordered 10 December 1813
 Laid down: May 1811 by Guillaume; re-laid April 1814 at Portsmouth
 Launched: 13 April 1816
 Completed: 27 April 1816 at Portsmouth Dockyard.
 Fate: Sold to be broken up on 11 January 1862.
 
 Builder: Deptford Dockyard
 Ordered: 4 April 1811
 Laid down: October 1811
 Launched: 21 October 1812
 Completed: 10 December 1812.
 Fate: Sold to be broken up on 27 May 1841.
 
 Builder: Deptford Dockyard
 Ordered: 6 January 1812
 Laid down: October 1812
 Launched: 6 April 1814
 Completed: 6 May 1814.
 Fate: Broken up in September 1859.
 
 Builder: Deptford Dockyard
 Ordered: 11 December 1812
 Laid down: November 1813
 Launched: 28 December 1814
 Completed: 5 March 1815.
 Fate: Training ship 1860, renamed Briton 8 November 1889. Sold to be broken up on 12 May 1908.
  – re-ordered to a radically new design from 1816.
 Builder: Deptford Dockyard
 Ordered: 11 December 1812
 Laid down: March 1816
 Launched: 12 January 1819
 Completed: 1824.
 Fate: Receiving ship in November 1850, renamed Calypso on 9 March 1870. Sold to be broken up on 28 February 1895.

References
 Robert Gardiner, The Heavy Frigate, Conway Maritime Press, London 1994.
 Rif Winfield, British Warships in the Age of Sail, 1793–1817: Design, Construction, Careers and Fates, 2nd edition, Seaforth Publishing, 2008. .
 David Lyon and Rif Winfield, The Sail and Steam Navy List, 1815–1889, Chatham Publishing, 2004. .

 
Frigates of the Royal Navy
Ship classes of the Royal Navy